Roela (Ruil in German) is a small borough in Vinni Parish (Kirchspiel Finn before 1930), Lääne-Viru County (Wierland before 1919) in northeastern Estonia.

History
Before the 13th century, there has been stronghold labelled in the Estonian language "Roela linnamägi", but there has not been any closer archaeological examination as per data from 2010. It is presumed that Roela Linnamägi was created 6.-7 century AD. It was part of Viru-Jaagupi parish (ancient local council before Christianity arrived) and hence independent county of Virumaa until Livonian Crusade reached Virumaa in 1219.

Roela was mentioned first time in writing in 1241 in Danish Census Book (Liber Census Damae) and as per data, Manor was established as "Roilse" and "Vettaerokae" did belong to Henric de Vspessil and in 1453, Roela Manor house was built instead of the Vettaerokae village. The Manor house was mentioned first time under the name Rogell.

In 1816, during the reign of Alexander I of Russia the process of abolition of serfdom in Livonia took place. Similar developments took place in Governorate of Estonia where Roela was located.
Serfdom abolishment did not change the situation for the local peasants and the land around Roela was mostly owned by nobility, consisting of Baltic Germans, living in the Manor house.

In 1836, Roela village did have 36 farms within its limits.

1840 Roela manor was bought by Ferdinand von Wrangel who did hand it as a gift to his wife Elisabeth. Elisabeth died in Roela in 1850.
Their son, Wilhelm von Wrangel, born in 1831 in Sitka, Alaska, did become later the owner of Roela manor.
In 1894 this manor was passed on to his son Ferdinand von Wrangel.

1905 Russian Revolution did also reach Roela. Manor house properties were damaged during the insurgency.

After the Estonian War of Independence, Land Reform applied in 1920 redistributed most of the land belonging to the Manor house to the local peasant population.

in 2012, local medical point closed as Doctor Tõnis Nurk, did finish providing medical services to local population.

Geography 
Roela is located at the eastern edge of Pandivere Upland. The area has many springs, it is part of the Pandivere water protection area, and Kunda river starts from here at Uuemõisa area in Roela.

Next to Roela Manor house, there is a reservoir that was cleaned and shores were renovated in 2002.

Administrative districts 
Roela has now local parish/council sub service centre that serves following villages: Roela alevik, Alavere, Lepiku, Lähtse, Obja, Puka, Rasivere, Ristiküla, Rünga, Saara, Soonuka ja Tammiku.

Economy 
Traditionally, agriculture and forestry have provided the livelihood to the local community.
During Soviet occupation, Roela was designated as sovkhoz. Several different industries were developed in the area, such as turkey farming, that are no longer present anymore. Planned economy spared Roela region from the environmental destruction that some other areas were subject to in Virumaa.

At the moment there are several active farms in other fields such as beekeeping that also carry longer tradition in the area. Many of them are oriented to produce organic food due to the undisturbed and unspoiled ecological conditions in the past.

Education 
 Ferdinand von Wrangell`i nim. Roela Põhikool, a basic school and kindergarten in Roela, named after Wrangell. The school had 75 pupils in 2009/2010.

Culture 
Roela has active non-profit organization MTÜ Roela Kodukant from 19th November 2004.
The management has 5 members in 2023 and the aim of the organization is to develop life in Roela and the villages surrounding it.
All related activities are only on volunteer basis. Traditional activities are organization of Spring fair, Jaanipäev, History conference and Christmas fair.

Notable people 
 Ferdinand von Wrangel (1797–1870), Baltic German explorer and seaman in the Imperial Russian Navy, did live his last years before his death in Roela Manor house
 Mihkel Jürna (1899–1973), Novelist and translator
  (1923–1960), Actress with a specialty of making children, especially boys, voice imitations
 Mihkel Juhkam (1884–1942), Politician, member of 1919 Estonian Constituent Assembly election and Minister of War in the government of August Rei in 1928-1929

References

External links 
 Satellite map at Maplandia.com

Boroughs and small boroughs in Estonia